James Marlan Coughtry (September 11, 1934 – November 8, 2016) was an American professional baseball infielder who appeared in 35 total games played over two seasons for four Major League Baseball clubs. For his MLB career, Coughtry posted a .185 batting average (10-for-54) with six runs and four run batted in (RBI).

Coughtry played college baseball at Long Beach City College, and was signed by the Boston Red Sox in 1954. He began his professional career with the Corning Red Sox, and had a .333 batting average in 93 games with the team. In 1955, he was promoted to the San Jose Red Sox, and had a .295 batting average, 11 triples, and 11 home runs. He played in 72 games for the Albany Senators the following year, then spent 22 games with the Oklahoma City Indians in 1957. Coughtry missed the 1958 season, and spent both 1959 and 1960 between the Allentown Red Sox and the Minneapolis Millers. With Allentown in 1960, he had a .308 batting average and 13 home runs.

In September 1960, the Boston Red Sox brought him up to the major league roster, and he made his debut on September 2, playing in 15 games for a seventh-place team during the closing weeks of that season. In Ted Williams' final game for the Red Sox on September 28, 1960, Coughtry started at second base and collected two hits in three at bats. He hit a single and scored the tying run in the ninth inning to help give the Red Sox a win. The following season, Coughtry played for the Seattle Rainiers, and had a .296 batting average in 148 games. 

After the 1961 season, the Los Angeles Angels selected Coughtry in the rule 5 draft, and he played in 11 games for the  Angels. On May 12, as they were cutting their roster from 28 to 25 men, the Angels traded Coughtry to the Kansas City Athletics for outfielder Gordie Windhorn; then, on July 2, after six games with Kansas City, Coughtry's contract was sold to the Cleveland Indians. He played three games for the Indians before being sidelined by a sore back, and he retired from professional baseball shortly afterward.

References

External links

Retrosheet

1934 births
2016 deaths
Albany Senators players
Allentown Red Sox players
Baseball players from Los Angeles
Boston Red Sox players
Cleveland Indians players
Corning Red Sox players
Kansas City Athletics players
Los Angeles Angels players
Major League Baseball second basemen
Major League Baseball third basemen
Minneapolis Millers (baseball) players
Oklahoma City Indians players
People from Hollywood, Los Angeles
San Jose Red Sox players
Seattle Rainiers players
Long Beach City Vikings baseball players